= Callinicum =

Callinicum may refer to the following places and jurisdictions :

- an Ancient city and former bishopric, now Raqqa in Syria.
- two Catholic titular bishoprics, both of episcopal rank, 'restoring' the above diocese :
  - Latin Callinicum of the Romans
  - Maronite (Eastern Catholic, Antiochian Rite) Callinicum of the Maronites.
